William Chapman (fl. 1416) of Arundel, Sussex, was an English politician.

He was a Member (MP) of the Parliament of England for Arundel in March 1416.

References

Year of birth missing
Year of death missing
English MPs March 1416
People from Arundel